UFC 109: Relentless was a mixed martial arts event held by the Ultimate Fighting Championship (UFC) on February 6, 2010, at the Mandalay Bay Events Center in Las Vegas, Nevada.

Background
A previously rumoured bout between Renzo Gracie and Matt Hughes did not take place on this card, but took place at UFC 112.

A Middleweight Championship bout between Anderson Silva and Vitor Belfort was confirmed by UFC President Dana White, although it was contingent on Silva's successful recovery from elbow surgery. Subsequently, the fight was rescheduled due to Silva's continued slow healing from surgery.  The Silva vs. Belfort bout was expected to take place at UFC 112, however Belfort was forced to withdraw from the fight and Demian Maia replaced him, after number one contender Chael Sonnen was not clear to fight.

Antônio Rogério Nogueira had to withdraw from his bout against Brandon Vera due to an ankle injury. It was announced that Vera will face future Light Heavyweight Champion Jon Jones on March 21, 2010, at UFC Live: Vera vs. Jones.

Josh Koscheck was scheduled to face Paulo Thiago, but was forced off the card with an injury. Mike Swick stepped in as Koscheck's replacement and fought Thiago.

The bout between Randy Couture and Mark Coleman was originally scheduled for UFC 17 in 1998, but a Couture injury forced the cancellation of the bout. Nearly twelve years later, this bout headlined UFC 109. It marked the first time in UFC history that two Hall of Fame inductees fought in an event.

Mostapha Al-turk ran into visa issues that prevented him from making the trip to Las Vegas his fight against Rolles Gracie. Both Jon Madsen and Joey Beltran were pegged as possible late replacements to step in and fight Rolles Gracie, before Beltran got the nod as the replacement fighter against Gracie.

Dana White also announced that the winner of the Nate Marquardt and Chael Sonnen fight would receive a title shot against the winner of the Silva/Belfort fight at UFC 112.

Results

Bonus awards
Fighters were awarded $60,000 bonuses.

Fight of the Night: Nate Marquardt vs. Chael Sonnen
Knockout of the Night: Matt Serra
Submission of the Night: Paulo Thiago

Reported payout
The following is the reported payout to the fighters as reported to the Nevada State Athletic Commission. It does not include sponsor money or "locker room" bonuses often given by the UFC and also do not include the UFC's traditional "fight night" bonuses.

Randy Couture: $250,000 (no win bonus) def. Mark Coleman: $60,000
Chael Sonnen: $64,000 (includes $32,000 win bonus) def. Nate Marquardt: $45,000
Paulo Thiago: $30,000 ($15,000 win bonus) def. Mike Swick: $43,000
Demian Maia: $62,000 ($31,000 win bonus) def. Dan Miller: $15,000
Matt Serra: $150,000 ($75,000 win bonus) def. Frank Trigg: $30,000
Mac Danzig: $40,000 ($20,000 win bonus) def. Justin Buchholz: $8,000
Melvin Guillard: $28,000 ($14,000 win bonus) def. Ronys Torres: $4,000
Rob Emerson: $24,000 ($12,000 win bonus) def. Phillipe Nover: $10,000
Phil Davis: $10,000 ($5,000 win bonus) def. Brian Stann: $17,000
Chris Tuchscherer: $20,000 ($10,000 win bonus) def. Tim Hague: $7,000
Joey Beltran: $12,000 ($6,000 win bonus) def. Rolles Gracie: $15,000

Television rating
The preliminary bouts shown on Spike TV at 9 pm EST drew a series-high of 1.7 million viewers.

See also
 Ultimate Fighting Championship
 List of UFC champions
 List of UFC events
 2010 in UFC

References

Ultimate Fighting Championship events
2010 in mixed martial arts
Mixed martial arts in Las Vegas
2010 in sports in Nevada